Phoenix Peak is a  mountain summit located in the Kenai Mountains, on the Kenai Peninsula, in the U.S. state of Alaska. The first ascent of the peak was made July 23, 1964, by Don Stockard of the Mountaineering Club of Alaska. The peak was named in 1965 by the Mountaineering Club of Alaska for the first ship ever built in Russian America, the Phoenix, which was constructed in 1794 by Russians in nearby Resurrection Bay. The mountain's name was officially adopted in 1966 by the United States Geological Survey.

Climate

Based on the Köppen climate classification, Phoenix Peak is located in a subarctic climate zone with long, cold, snowy winters, and mild summers. Temperatures can drop below −20 °C with wind chill factors below −30 °C. Precipitation runoff from the mountain and meltwater from its glaciers drains into tributaries of the Resurrection River. The months May and June offer the most favorable weather for viewing the mountain. In fair weather, the Harding Icefield can be seen from the summit.

See also

List of mountain peaks of Alaska
Geology of Alaska

References

External links
 Phoenix Peak Weather forecast
 Phoenix Peak: Flickr photo
 Phoenix Peak: Flickr photo
 Phoenix Peak seen from Mount Ascension: Flickr photo
 Mountain Forecast

Mountains of Alaska
Mountains of Kenai Peninsula Borough, Alaska
Kenai Mountains-Turnagain Arm National Heritage Area
Kenai Fjords National Park
North American 1000 m summits